Nemoraeini is a tribe of flies in the family Tachinidae.

Genera
Nemoraea Robineau-Desvoidy, 1830

References

Brachyceran flies of Europe
Brachycera tribes
Tachininae